The Trial (previously ,  and ) is a novel written by Franz Kafka in 1914 and 1915 and published posthumously on 26 April 1925. One of his best known works, it tells the story of Josef K., a man arrested and prosecuted by a remote, inaccessible authority, with the nature of his crime revealed neither to him nor to the reader. Heavily influenced by Dostoevsky's Crime and Punishment and The Brothers Karamazov, Kafka even went so far as to call Dostoevsky a blood relative. Like Kafka's two other novels, The Trial was never completed, although it does include a chapter which appears to bring the story to an intentionally abrupt ending.

After Kafka's death in 1924 his friend and literary executor Max Brod edited the text for publication by Verlag Die Schmiede. The original manuscript is held at the Museum of Modern Literature, Marbach am Neckar, Germany. The first English-language translation, by Willa and Edwin Muir, was published in 1937. In 1999, the book was listed in Le Monde 100 Books of the Century and as No. 2 of the Best German Novels of the Twentieth Century.

Development
Kafka drafted the opening sentence of The Trial in August 1914, and continued work on the novel throughout 1915. This was an unusually productive period for Kafka, despite the outbreak of World War I, which significantly increased the pressures of his day job as an insurance agent.

Having begun by writing the opening and concluding sections of the novel, Kafka worked on the intervening scenes in a haphazard manner, using several different notebooks simultaneously. His friend Max Brod, knowing Kafka's habit of destroying his own work, eventually took the manuscript into safekeeping. This manuscript consisted of 161 loose pages torn from notebooks, which Kafka had bundled together into chapters. The order of the chapters was not made clear to Brod, nor was he told which parts were complete and which unfinished. Following Kafka's death in 1924, Brod edited the work and assembled it into a novel to the best of his ability. Further editorial work has been done by later scholars, but Kafka's final vision for The Trial remains unknown.

Plot summary

On the morning of his thirtieth birthday, Josef K., the chief cashier of a bank, is unexpectedly arrested by two unidentified agents from an unspecified agency for an unspecified crime. Josef is not imprisoned, however, but left "free" and told to await instructions from the Committee of Affairs. Josef's landlady, Frau Grubach, tries to console Josef about the trial, but insinuates that the procedure may be related to an immoral relationship with his neighbor Fräulein Bürstner. Josef visits Bürstner to vent his worries, and then kisses her. 

A few days later, Josef finds that Fräulein Montag, a lodger from another room, has moved in with Fräulein Bürstner. He suspects that this maneuver is meant to distance him from Bürstner. Josef is ordered to appear at the court's address the coming Sunday, without being told the exact time or room. After a period of exploration, Josef finds the court in the attic. Josef is severely reproached for his tardiness, and he arouses the assembly's hostility after a passionate plea about the absurdity of the trial and the emptiness of the accusation.

Josef later tries to confront the presiding judge over his case, but only finds an attendant's wife. The woman gives him information about the process and attempts to seduce him before a law student bursts into the room and takes the woman away, claiming her to be his mistress. The woman's husband then takes Josef on a tour of the court offices, which ends after Josef becomes extremely weak in the presence of other court officials and accused. 

One evening, in a storage room at his own bank, Josef discovers the two agents who arrested him being whipped by a flogger for asking Josef for bribes and as a result of complaints Josef made at court. Josef tries to argue with the flogger, saying that the men need not be whipped, but the flogger cannot be swayed. The next day he returns to the storage room and is shocked to find everything as he had found it the day before, including the whipper and the two agents. 

Josef is visited by his uncle, a traveling countryman. Worried by the rumors about his nephew, the uncle introduces Josef to Herr Huld, a sickly and bedridden lawyer tended to by Leni, a young nurse who shows an immediate attraction to Josef. During the conversation, Leni calls Josef away and takes him to the next room for a sexual encounter. Afterward, Josef meets his angry uncle outside, who claims that Josef's lack of respect for the process has hurt his case.

During subsequent visits to Huld, Josef realizes that he is a capricious character who will not be of much help. At the bank, one of Josef's clients recommends him to seek the advice of Titorelli, the court's official painter. Titorelli has no real influence within the court, but his deep experience of the process is painfully illuminating to Josef, and he can only suggest complex and unpleasant hypothetical options, as no definitive acquittal has ever been managed. Josef finally decides to dismiss Huld and take control of matters himself. Upon arriving at Huld's office, Josef meets a downtrodden individual, Rudi Block, a client who offers Josef some insight from a client's perspective. Block's case has continued for five years and he has gone from being a successful businessman to being almost bankrupt and is virtually enslaved by his dependence on the lawyer and Leni, with whom he appears to be sexually involved. The lawyer mocks Block in front of Josef for his dog-like subservience. This experience further poisons Josef's opinion of his lawyer. 

Josef is put in charge of accompanying an important Italian client to the city's cathedral. While inside the cathedral, a priest calls Josef by name and tells him a fable (which was published earlier as "Before the Law") that is meant to explain his situation. The priest tells Josef that the parable is an ancient text of the court, and many generations of court officials have interpreted it differently. On the eve of Josef's thirty-first birthday, two men arrive at his apartment to execute him. They lead him to a small quarry outside the city, and kill him with a butcher's knife. Josef summarizes his situation with his last words: "Like a dog!"

Characters
 Josef K. – The tale's protagonist: a thirty year old, unmarried bank administrator living in an unnamed city.
 Fräulein Bürstner – A boarder in the same house as Josef K. She lets him kiss her one night, but then rebuffs his advances. K. briefly catches sight of her, or someone who looks similar to her, in the final pages of the novel.
 Fräulein Montag – Friend of Fräulein Bürstner, she talks to K. about ending his relationship with Fräulein Bürstner after his arrest. She claims she can bring him insight, because she is an objective third party.
 Willem and Franz – Officers who arrest K. one morning but refuse to disclose the crime he is said to have committed. They are later flogged.
 Inspector – Man who conducts a proceeding at Josef K.'s boardinghouse to inform K. officially that he is under arrest.
 Rabinsteiner, Kullich and Kaminer – Junior bank employees who attend the proceeding at the boardinghouse.
 Frau Grubach – The proprietress of the lodging house in which K. lives. She holds K. in high esteem, despite his arrest.
 Woman in the Court – The first judgement of K happens in her house. She claims help from K. because she does not want to be abused by the magistrates.
 Student – Deformed man who acts under orders of the instruction judge. Will be a powerful man in the future.
 Instruction Judge – First Judge of K. In his trial, he confuses K. with a wall painter.
 Uncle Karl – K.'s impetuous uncle from the country, formerly his guardian. Upon hearing of the trial, Karl insists that K. hire Herr Huld, the lawyer.
 Herr Huld, the Lawyer – K.'s pompous and pretentious advocate who provides little in the way of action and far too much in the way of anecdote.
 Leni – Herr Huld's nurse, she has feelings for Josef K. and soon becomes his lover. She shows him her webbed hand, yet another reference to the motif of the hand throughout the book. Apparently, she finds accused men extremely attractive — the fact of their indictment makes them irresistible to her.
 Albert – Office director at the court, and a friend of Huld.
 Flogger – Man who punishes Franz and Willem in the Bank after K.'s complaints against the two agents in his first Judgement.
 Vice-President – K.'s unctuous rival at the Bank, only too willing to catch K. in a compromising situation. He repeatedly takes advantage of K.'s preoccupation with the trial to advance his own ambitions.
 President – Manager of the Bank. A sickly figure, whose position the Vice-President is trying to assume. Gets on well with K., inviting him to various engagements.
 Rudi Block, the Merchant – Block is another accused man and client of Huld. His case is five years old, and he is but a shadow of the prosperous grain dealer he once was. All his time, energy, and resources are now devoted to his case, to the detriment of his own life. Although he has hired five additional lawyers on the side, he is completely and pathetically subservient to Huld.
 Manufacturer – Person who hears about K.'s case and advises him to see a painter who knows how the court system works.
 Titorelli, the Painter – Titorelli inherited the position of Court Painter from his father. He knows a great deal about the comings and goings of the court's lowest level. He offers to help K., and manages to unload a few identical landscape paintings on the accused man.
 Priest – Prison chaplain whom K. encounters in a church. The priest advises K. that his case is going badly and tells him to accept his fate.
 Doorkeeper and Farmer – The characters of the Chaplain's Tale.

Translations into English

 Everyman's Library, 30 June 1992, Translation: Willa and Edwin Muir, 
 Schocken Books, 25 May 1999, Translation: Breon Mitchell,  Translator's preface is available online
 Dover Thrift Editions, 22 July 2009, Translation: David Wyllie, 
 Oxford World's Classics, 4 October 2009, Translation: Mike Mitchell, 
 Penguin Modern Classics, 29 June 2000, Translation: Idris Parry, 
 , 15 September 2012, Translation: Susanne Lück and Maureen Fitzgibbons, 
 BigFontBooks.com, Large Print Edition, 4 June 2019, Translation: David Wyllie, 

In addition, a graphic novel adaptation by Chantal Montellier (illustrations) and David Zane Mairowitz (adaptation) appeared on April 15, 2008.

Audiobooks in English
 Blackstone Audio, Narrated by Geoffrey Howard, Translated by Breon Mitchell, 7 hours 47 minutes, Published August 4, 2008

Dramatic adaptations

Stage
 The writer and director Steven Berkoff adapted several of Kafka's novels into plays and directed them for stage. His version of The Trial was first performed in 1970 in London and published in 1981.
 Israeli director Rina Yerushalmi adapted The Trial (paired with Samuel Beckett's Malone Dies) for a production called Ta, Ta, Tatata presented in June 1970 at La MaMa Experimental Theatre Club.
 Chicago based writer, Greg Allen, wrote and directed K., based on The Trial. After award-winning runs in Chicago and New York, it was produced by The Hypocrites and ran for several months in 2010 at The Chopin Theater in Chicago.
 Joseph K, written by Tom Basden and based on The Trial, takes place in modern-day London, with the protagonist cast as a City banker. It ran at the Gate Theatre, Notting Hill, London, in late 2010.
 Gottfried von Einem wrote an opera, Der Prozeß, based on the novel. Its American debut was directed by Otto Preminger.
 The writer Serge Lamothe adapted The Trial for the stage. Directed by François Girard, his version of The Trial was first performed in 2004 in Montreal and Ottawa, Canada, and published in 2005.
 Between June and August 2015 The Young Vic theatre in London staged a version of The Trial adapted by Nick Gill and starring Rory Kinnear as K.
Jean-Louis Barrault and Andre Gide adapted the novel for the stage, performed in Paris in 1947.
An operatic adaptation of The Trial by the composer Philip Glass was premiered by Music Theatre Wales in October 2014.

Radio
 On 19 May 1946, Columbia Workshop broadcast an adaptation of The Trial by Davidson Taylor with an original musical score by Bernard Herrmann and starring Karl Swenson as Joseph K.
 In 1982, Mike Gwilym starred as Josef K. with Miriam Margolyes as Leni in an adaptation on BBC Radio 4 dramatised for radio by Hanif Kureishi.
 Sam Troughton starred as Joseph Kay in a new adaptation by Mark Ravenhill titled The Process directed by Polly Thomas and broadcast on 10 May 2015 on BBC Radio 3's Drama on 3 program.

Film
 In the 1962 film adaptation by Orson Welles, Josef K. is played by Anthony Perkins and The Advocate by Welles.
 Martin Scorsese's 1985 film After Hours contains a scene adapted from "Before the Law", in which the protagonist is trying to get into a nightclub named Club Berlin.
 The 1993 film The Trial was based on Harold Pinter's screenplay adaptation. Directed by David Jones, it starred Kyle MacLachlan as Josef K. and Anthony Hopkins as The Priest.
 The 2017 science fiction film Blade Runner 2049 features a protagonist named Officer K, who is referred to as "Joe", an allusion to Josef K.

References

Further reading

External links

 
 Der Prozeß, original text in German
 
 
 Kafka's parable "Before the Law", Herbert Deinert, May 1964, Cornell University

1925 German-language novels
1925 science fiction novels
Absurdist fiction
1925 Austrian novels
Novels published posthumously
Austrian novels adapted into films
Dystopian novels
Existentialist novels
Fictional lawsuits
Modernist novels
Novels adapted into operas
Novels by Franz Kafka
Unfinished novels
Bureaucracy in fiction